Neocollyris ovata is a species of ground beetle in the genus Neocollyris in the family Carabidae. It was described by Naviaux and Sawada in 1993.

References

Ovata, Neocollyris
Beetles described in 1993